= Raymond Edoh =

UN-Habitat Ambassadors, politicians, and entrepreneurs

UN-Habitat Ambassadors
- Incumbent
- Assumed role 09 December 2023

Personal details
- Born: Benue State, Nigeria
- Profession: Diplomat, politician, entrepreneur

Raymond Edoh is a Nigerian public advocate, diplomat, politician, and development practitioner. He serves as a United Nations Human Settlements Programme (UN‑Habitat) ambassador to Nigeria, and was appointed UN Volunteer ambassador to Nigeria. He is the national commandant of the International Police Chaplain Sustainable Development and Law Enforcement (IPCSL) in Nigeria.

== Early life ==
Edoh is from Benue State, Nigeria.

== Career and public roles ==
=== UN‑Habitat and UN volunteer appointments ===
Edoh is a UN‑Habitat ambassador to Nigeria, and was appointed UN volunteer Ambassador at an event held on UN Volunteer International Day in Abuja. In remarks at the appointment event, he emphasized strengthening volunteerism and improving the volunteering ecosystem in Nigeria.

=== IPCSL leadership ===
In 2023, Edoh assumed office as the National Commandant of the International Police Chaplain Sustainable Development and Law Enforcement Inc. (IPCSL) in Nigeria, pledging collaboration with security agencies and stakeholders to advance the organisation’s mission on sustainable development and law enforcement support.

== Advocacy priorities ==
Edoh’s public statements and programme announcements identify several recurring priorities:

- Youth empowerment through mobilization, training, and civic engagement
- Volunteerism and community development as mechanisms for national growth and social cohesion
- Partnerships with security and enforcement agencies to support law enforcement‑adjacent initiatives and community safety

== Politics ==
Edoh has been active in Nigerian politics as a public advocate and aspirant. In 2025 the National Civil Society Forum of Professionals (NCSFP) publicly urged the federal government to consider him for an appointment, praising his contributions to national development and his role in political mobilization.

Edoh has declared political ambitions in Benue State and has campaigned on a platform prioritizing youth employment, security, agricultural development, and women’s empowerment. In statements outlining his 2027 governorship bid he proposed a statewide Youth Jobs and Skills Programme, a Benue Youth Enterprise Fund, and measures to strengthen primary healthcare and rural infrastructure.

== Recognition and affiliations ==
Edoh is a Life Fellow of the International Chartered World Learned Society (ICWLS), USA. His ambassadorial and volunteer appointments have been publicized at national events attended by government and United Nations representatives
